Satar may refer to:

Places
 Satar, Iran, a municipality in Kolyai District, Sonqor County, Kermanshah Province
 Satar Rural District, Kolyai District, Sonqor County, Kermanshah Province, Iran
 Satar, Deoghar, Deoghar District, Jharkhand State, India; a village

People
Given name
 Sattar also spelled "Satar", a male Muslim given name

Surname
 Alif Satar (born 1990) Malaysian actor-singer
 Aziz Satar (1925–2014) Malaysian actor-singer-comedian
 Mostafa Abdel Satar (born 1990) Egyptian soccer player
 Yakup Satar (1898–2008) last surviving Ottoman Turkish veteran of WWI

Other uses
 Za'atar also spelled "satar", a family of herbs, that includes basil, thyme, savory, oregano.
 Sataer also spelled "satar" ), a type of Uyghur lute
 SATAR, former name of the USAF experimental satellite series called "Orbiting Vehicle"

See also
 Abdul Satar, a given name
 Sattar
 Sitar (disambiguation)
 Setar (disambiguation)